Fred Joseph Glatz (born July 31, 1933) is a former American football player who played for Pittsburgh Steelers of the National Football League (NFL). He played college football at the University of Pittsburgh.

He served as head coach at St. John’s Prep in Danvers, MA from 1967 through 1983, compiling a record of 105-41-7.

References

1933 births
Living people
American football ends
Pittsburgh Panthers football players
Pittsburgh Steelers players